The following is a list of pipeline accidents in the United States in 1981. It is one of several lists of U.S. pipeline accidents. See also: list of natural gas and oil production accidents in the United States.

Incidents 

This is not a complete list of all pipeline accidents. For natural gas alone, the Pipeline and Hazardous Materials Safety Administration (PHMSA), a United States Department of Transportation agency, has collected data on more than 3,200 accidents deemed serious or significant since 1987.

A "significant incident" results in any of the following consequences:
 Fatality or injury requiring in-patient hospitalization.
 $50,000 or more in total costs, measured in 1984 dollars.
 Liquid releases of five or more barrels (42 US gal/barrel).
 Releases resulting in an unintentional fire or explosion.

PHMSA and the National Transportation Safety Board (NTSB) post-incident data and results of investigations into accidents involving pipelines that carry a variety of products, including natural gas, oil, diesel fuel, gasoline, kerosene, jet fuel, carbon dioxide, and other substances. Occasionally pipelines are re-purposed to carry different products.

The following incidents occurred during 1981:

 1981 A valve on the Trans-Alaska Pipeline System broke on January 1, releasing 42,000 gallons of crude oil 115 miles south of Prudhoe Bay, Alaska.
 1981 On January 5, a gas transmission pipeline exploded and burned in Laingsburg, Michigan, causing a large fire. About a dozen homes nearby were evacuated. There were no injuries.
 1981 On February 13, construction workers severed an ethylene pipeline near Beaumont, Texas, which then exploded and burned. Three people were injured.
 1981 On April 7, a 6 inch natural gas pipeline exploded, near Columbus City, Iowa. That failure caused a nearby 16 inch gas pipeline to explode and burn about 20 minutes later. The resulting fire could be seen for 35 miles. There was no injuries.
 1981 On April 16, an explosion & fire in a gas feeder line to an underground gas storage facility in Columbus Junction, Iowa burned down a barn, and damaged other buildings. This was the second explosion at the facility in just over a week, and, the fifth explosion there in 6 years.
 1981 An ammonia pipeline leaked near Hutchinson, Kansas on July 31, injuring 5 people, including 3 children at a Bible Camp. A  radius from the leak was evacuated, including 90 from the Bible Camp.
 1981 On August 25, in downtown San Francisco, California, a 16-inch natural gas main was punctured by a drill that an excavation contractor was using. Escaping natural gas blew upward and carried into the Embarcadero Complex and other nearby buildings. There was no ignition; however, the gas stream entrained an oil containing polychlorinated biphenyl (PCB). Fall-out affected an eight-square-block area of the city's financial district covering buildings, cars, trees, pedestrians, police, and firemen. Approximately 30,000 persons were safely evacuated from the area in 45 minutes. No one was killed or seriously injured, although many persons were sprayed with the PCB oil mist. There were delays in shutting down the gas, due to inaccurate diagrams.
 1981 On September 4, a drilling rig, operated by a crew core-drilling for coal, near Belle, West Virginia, punctured a 12-inch gas transmission line. The pipeline was operating at a pressure of 600 psig. The rig operator was injured, the rig and a truck were destroyed, and an estimated volume of 3,433,000 cubic feet of gas was lost.
 1981 On September 15, during routine maintenance, a pipeline exploded and burned between a gas plant and a petroleum plant in Goldsmith, Texas. While workers were fighting the fire, another part of the pipeline burst and burned. 6 workers were burned, and another had other injuries. There were a total of 7 fires from 7 pipeline ruptures.
 1981 A 12-inch diameter pipeline, near Ackerly, Texas, was hit by a rathole drill on September 27, releasing an ethane-propane mix. There was then an explosion & fire that killed 4 people.
 1981 On November 30, at Flatwoods, West Virginia, gas leaking into a test section of a 26-inch gas transmission pipeline, ignited while a welder engaged in installing an end cap on the east end of a -long section of pipe. The resultant explosion blew off-the end cap, which struck and killed the welder's helper.
 1981 On December 5, hunters near Yutan, Nebraska tried out a new high power rifle by shooting what they thought was a log in a creek bed. The log was actually an LPG pipeline, and 12 to 16 families needed to be evacuated for their safety from the resulting vapor cloud. There was no fire.
 1981 On December 9, a pipeline carrying gasoline ruptured near Joliet, Illinois, spilling  of gasoline into the Des Plaines River.
 1981 A 20-inch gas pipeline in Ottawa, Kansas caused 2 explosions, and a raging fire, that destroyed 2 mobile homes on December 31. There were no injuries reported.

References

Lists of pipeline accidents in the United States